Saucon may refer to the following in the U.S. state of Pennsylvania:

Saucon Creek,  a tributary of the Lehigh River
Saucon Valley, Pennsylvania, in eastern Pennsylvania
Lower Saucon Township, Northampton County, Pennsylvania, in the above valley
Upper Saucon Township, Lehigh County, Pennsylvania, in the above valley
Saucon Valley Country Club, in Upper Saucon Township
Saucon Valley School District, in Northampton County
Saucon Valley High School, in the above school district